Simone Simeri (born 12 April 1993) is an Italian professional footballer who plays as a forward for  club Imolese on loan from Bari.

Career

Napoli
Born in Naples, Campania region, Simeri started his career at S.S.C. Napoli. He was a player of Napoli's under-17 team in National Allievi League in 2009–10 season; under-16 team in Campania Regional Allievi League in 2008–09 season; under-15 team in National Giovanissimi League in 2007–08 season and under-14 team in Campania Regional Giovanissimi League in 2006–07 season.

Melfi
In summer 2011 he was signed by Lega Pro Seconda Divisione club Melfi in a co-ownership deal, for a peppercorn of €500. The deal was renewed in June 2012 and terminated in June 2013, in favour of Melfi.

Serie D clubs
Simeri left Melfi for Puteolana Internapoli in summer 2014.

Novara
After 3 seasons with several Serie D clubs, he was signed by Serie B club Novara on 1 July 2017. He was assigned number 9 shirt.

Ascoli
On 21 January 2021, he joined Serie B club Ascoli on loan.

Monopoli
On 29 July 2022, Simeri was loaned to Monopoli.

Imolese
On 6 January 2023, Simeri moved on a new loan to Imolese.

Honours
Bari
 Serie C: 2021–22 (Group C)

References

External links
 
 AIC profile (data by football.it) 

1993 births
Living people
Footballers from Naples
Italian footballers
Association football forwards
Serie B players
Serie C players
Serie D players
S.S.C. Napoli players
A.S. Melfi players
Rende Calcio 1968 players
Potenza Calcio players
U.S. Folgore Caratese A.S.D. players
Novara F.C. players
S.S. Juve Stabia players
S.S.C. Bari players
Ascoli Calcio 1898 F.C. players
S.S. Monopoli 1966 players
Imolese Calcio 1919 players